Christopher Muneza (born 30 January 1994) is a Rwandan singer, songwriter. He was a second-place finisher of Primus Guma Guma Superstar (PGGSS) seasons 6 and 7.  He attributes his success to himself and his mentor Clement Ishimwe, who auditioned Muneza when he was 15 years old.

In 2010, he started working with Kina Music House also contain many artists include Butera Knowless in his third year of high school in APACE and started making songs such as "Sigaho", "Amahitamo", "Ishema", and others.

In 2017, this artist participated in the Primus Guma Guma Super Star competition where he said that after "PGGSS", he would no longer work with Kina Music.

References

Living people
1994 births
Rwandan male singers